'I Still Believe in You' is a song written by Chris Hillman and Steve Hill, and recorded by American country music group The Desert Rose Band.  It was released in October 1988 as the second single from the album Running.  The song was the second and final number one on the country chart for The Desert Rose Band.  The single went to number one for one week and spent fifteen weeks on the country chart.

Chart performance

Year-end charts

References

1988 singles
The Desert Rose Band songs
Songs written by Chris Hillman
Song recordings produced by Paul Worley
MCA Records singles
Curb Records singles
1988 songs